Didn't You Used to Be... is the ninth studio album by American singer David Cassidy. It was released in 1992 and is the only album Cassidy released on Scotti Brothers Records. Originally titled Didn't You Used to Be?, the album features ten tracks which are all written or co-written by Cassidy's wife, Sue Shifrin.

The track "I'll Never Stop Loving You" was recorded by Heart—titled "Never Stop Loving You"―and was included on the Japanese special edition bonus 3-inch CD of their 1990 red velvet Brigade box set. It was later released by the EMI Japan label for the Heart compilation Ballads: The Greatest Hits in 1997 and with the reissue in 2001. Cher had also recorded the song for her 1991 album Love Hurts.

Track listing
All tracks composed by David Cassidy and Sue Shifrin; except where indicated
 "Raindrops" (Dee Clark, Sue Shifrin, Cassidy) – 4:18 
 "For All the Lonely" – 5:05 
 "Treat Me Like You Used To" (Cassidy, Sue Shifrin, Mark Spiro) – 3:50 
 "Somebody to Love" – 4:01 
 "I'll Never Stop Loving You" (Cassidy, Sue Shifrin, John Wetton) – 4:12 
 "Soul Kiss" – 3:56 
 "Tell Me True" – 4:15 
 "Like Father, Like Son" (Cassidy, Steve Diamond, Sue Shifrin) – 4:18 
 "It's Over" (Ken Gold, Sue Shifrin) – 3:42
 "One True Love" – 4:35

References

1992 albums
David Cassidy albums
Scotti Brothers Records albums